The 2002 EHF Women's Cup Winners' Cup was the twenty-sixth edition of EHF's competition for women's handball national cup champions. It ran from January 11 to May 18, 2002.

Like the previous edition, the trophy was won by a team from the former Soviet Union. Lada Togliatti, founded four years earlier, defeated 1984 and 1989 EHF Cup champion Oltchim Râmnicu Vâlcea in the final, becoming the competition's fourth champion from Russia.
 Lada also won its first Russian Superleague in this season.

Results

References

Women's EHF Cup Winners' Cup
2001 in handball
2002 in handball